Durnavirales is an order of double-stranded RNA viruses which infect eukaryotes. The name of the group derives from Italian duplo which means double (a reference to double-stranded), rna for the type of virus, and -virales which is the suffix for a virus order.

Families
The following families are recognized:

 Amalgaviridae
 Curvulaviridae
 Hypoviridae
 Partitiviridae
 Picobirnaviridae

References

Viruses